Johnny Campbell may refer to:

 John Campbell (footballer, born 1870) (1870–1906), Scottish footballer for Renton, Sunderland, Newcastle United 
 John Campbell (footballer, born 1872) (1872–1947), Scottish footballer for Celtic, Aston Villa, Third Lanark, Scotland
 John Campbell (footballer, born 1877) (1877–1919), Scottish footballer for Blackburn Rovers, Partick Thistle, Rangers, Hibernian, Scotland 
 Johnny Campbell (footballer, born 1894) (1894–1981), English footballer for Tranmere Rovers
 Johnny Campbell (footballer, born 1910) (1910–1999), Leicester City and Lincoln City forward
 Johnny Campbell (footballer, born 1923) (1923–1968), Irish footballer for Belfast Celtic, Fulham, Northern Ireland 
 Johnny Campbell (footballer, born 1928) (1928–2015), English footballer for Gateshead
 Johnny Campbell (rugby league), British rugby player

See also
 John Campbell (disambiguation)